Mohammad Taghavi is an Iranian retired football defender and current coach who was most recently interim manager of Tractor.

He played for Esteghlal and Iran national football team.

He was also a TV presenter who work for BBC Persian as football interpreter, when he lived in Birmingham from 2010 until 2015. He is currently a sports expert at Iran International.

His two older brothers, Reza Taghavi and Hossein Taghavi, are also football players.

Managerial statistics

Honours

Club
Asian Club Championship
Runner up: 1
1998–99 with Esteghlal

Azadegan League
Winner: 1
1997–98 with Esteghlal

Runner up: 2
1998–99 with Esteghlal
1999–2000 with Esteghlal

Third Place: 1
1995–96 With Esteghlal

Hazfi Cup
Winner: 2
1995–96 with Esteghlal
1999–2000 with Esteghlal

References

External links
 

Iranian footballers
People from Sari, Iran
Living people
Homa F.C. players
Esteghlal F.C. players
Iran international footballers
1972 births
1988 AFC Asian Cup players
Sportspeople from Sari, Iran
Association football defenders
Persian Gulf Pro League managers